Verin Tsaghkavan is a village in the Berd Municipality of the Tavush Province of Armenia.

Etymology 
The village was previously known as Veligegh and Veli.

Gallery

References

External links 

Populated places in Tavush Province